Wali may be:
Wali language (Sudan), a Nubian language
Wali language (Ghana), a Gur language